American Idol Season 11 Highlights is a compilation extended play by Phillip Phillips based on some of his American Idol performances. The EP was released exclusively through Walmart and consists of a few studio recordings made by Phillips during season 11 of American Idol.  It includes a duet with Elise Testone, his coronation song, "Home" and performances that were well received by the judges on the show. Similar EPs were also released through Walmart by fellow contestants from the Top 5, Jessica Sanchez, Joshua Ledet, Hollie Cavanagh and Skylar Laine. As of September 2012, it has sold 82,000 copies.

Track listing

Charts

References

2012 EPs
19 Recordings EPs